Jordi Ustrell Aguilà  (Barcelona, August 3, 1955) is a Computer Engineer. As an entrepreneur, he has developed diverse Projects related with emerging technologies, some of which left their mark in the history of Computing.

Development of the first Spanish Microcomputer 

At the end of the 70s, the development of the first microprocessor made possible the production of computers affordable both in terms of cost and size. This marks the beginning of a time of great activity in the field of computer systems engineering worldwide.

Eina Informàtica was born following the path paved by the pioneers of this revolution in California. Jordi Ustrell became its president and technical director.

In 1979, Jordi Ustrell designed what would be considered the first personal microcomputer developed in Spain. The project caught the attention of publications specialized in the history of modern computing technology.

He also developed some personal and professional Computer systems.

Reference works in CD-ROM format and the Spanish publishing Industry 

The development in 1982 of the Compact Disc (CD) by Sony and Philips, and its later version designed to contain date, the CD-ROM, drew the attention of Publishing Companies due to the large capacity and low cost of these discs. At this time, Publisher Marin founded an engineering company called ComCal SA with the objective of making major reference works and large document datebases available through microcomputers. Jordi Ustrell had been the technical director of the Company since its foundation.

ComCal developed the so called LST software, a software solution that converted reference works such as encyclopedias or pharmaceutical vademecums to large datebases, making those works computer-readable. LST software processed the same SGML format (precursor of HTML) files used by publishers. In the pre-Internet era, the possibilities of this technology were revolutionary.

One of the most important projects Jordi Ustrell led during this period was the publication of the CD-ROM Dictionary of Medicine Marin. Together with Vademecum:  Pharmaceutical Specialties, this was the first CD-ROM publication in Spanish, presented at the Liber Publishing Fair 87.

The Internet revolution 

Later, he became director of Technological Innovation at Banco Sabadell. From this position, he experienced firsthand the birth of the Internet in Spain and participated in an array of projects merged thanks to the possibilities provided by the network.

In the early 90s, before the introduction of the Internet in Spain, Jordi Ustrell collaborated with ISO as a member of the National Committee for Standardization CTN - 71/21, in relation with the interconnection of open systems. The OSI standards for communication between systems, which ended up being assimilated to the TCP/IP, are currently the standards used by DARPA on the Internet.

Early Internet 

In the early years of the Internet, Jordi Ustrell helped to spread the potential of the net and the revolution that involved. He led the introduction of Internet services at Banco Sabadell through the creation of initial infrastructure and the first domains, the development of the first corporate websites and the implementation of e-mail services in the Company.

He also worked on the launch of InfoVía, intended to be the Spanish Internet.

Later, he led the introduction of the first fully operational Internet banking services in Spain, both for individuals and companies, presented at Internet World, 1st National Congress of Internet Users, organized by AUI in February, 1996 in Madrid.

Ustrell was also responsible for the creation of the Virtual Art Gallery Banco Sabadell for the 1996 Internet World Exposition (1st Internet Universal Expo).

He led a project to promote the network and its advantages through the creation of an Internet Service Provider (ISP), and email at Banco Sabadell.

Ustrell also participated in the Banking Consortium Efectivo'98, with the aim of developing a program of Internet home banking participated by different banks.

Business networking 

The consolidation of the Internet helped to develop different banking services providing transactional support on the net, such as Internet payment systems: VISA SET, virtual POS (B2C) and payment gateway (B2B). Banco Sabadell participated in the world premiere of the payment method VISA SET.

Among banking services developed by Ustrell in this area are:

 Security and Trust: launch of a pioneering digital signature system for secure e-commerce using smart card.
 Early Mobile Banking: Implementation of a WAP channel for banking transactions from the mobile phone.
 New paradigms of work on the network: Creation of the Corporate Intranet / Extranet.
 100% Internet Bank: Creating a pioneer bank in the Internet (ActivoBank).
 Certification infrastructure for electronic commerce: launch of a global banking consortium (Identrus project) and a national banking consortium (Consortium Iberion).

As e-business developer, he was involved in the development of third-party businesses hosted on the network, such as:
 Project Firma, by the Spanish Ministry of Science and Technology (EDI): He participated in the definition of a legal and operational framework for electronic bills of exchange and promissory notes.

Later, with the advent of mobile Internet, he participated in a project aiming at planning opportunities for mobility in the banking and payment systems, and in the project High performance workplace.

Thanks to these projects, Jordi Ustrell earned recognition as a pioneer of the Internet in Catalonia, as reported by Saül Gordillo in Sobirania.cat.

References 

1955 births
Living people